Ombeni Yohana Sefue (born 26 August 1954) is a former Tanzanian diplomat. He was appointed as the Chief Secretary to the President of Tanzania on 31 December 2011. Previously he was the Permanent Representative of Tanzania to the United Nations.

Honours
: Order of the United Republic of Tanzania (First Class), December 2012

References

1954 births
Living people
Tanzanian civil servants
Ambassadors of Tanzania to the United States
Permanent Representatives of Tanzania to the United Nations
Mzumbe University alumni
Centre for Foreign Relations alumni